Football Club Kramatorsk is a professional Ukrainian football club from the city of Kramatorsk in Donetsk Oblast.

The club takes its history from a factory team of the Old Kramatorsk Machine-building Plant (SKMZ).

History

The club Avangard was reformed in 1955. Prior to World War II there existed a club that was associated with the machine industry in the city. In 1937, the club participated in the national championship as the champion of Ukraine. In 1939, the team won the Cup of Soviet Ukraine.

The team in 1936 won 1st place in Ukraine among working teams and in 1937, 1938 and 1961 reached the 1/16 finals of the Soviet Cup, and 1/8 finals of the Soviet Cup in 1939.

The club regularly participated in the Soviet championship (1946, 1948, 1949, 1960–1970) and the USSR Cup (1937–1939,1949,1961-1966/1967).

In the 1998–1999 season, the city of Kramatorsk was presented by a team of the Armed Forces of Ukraine, VPS Kramatorsk (Air Force), in the Ukrainian Second League. That team was penalized 6 points for failure to pay the licence fees to the PFL and was removed from the competition after the first round. During that period the actual factory team was called Bliuminh Kramatorsk and played in championship of Donetsk Oblast.

The team's revival brought back success as they became Donetsk oblast champions in 2010.
In 2011, the club appointed head coach Serhiy Shevchenko in preparation for returning to the Second League.

The club submitted a license to the Professional Football League of Ukraine and was accepted into the Ukrainian Second League for the 2011–12 season.

During the 2014–15 season, the club was suspended from the Professional Football League of Ukraine as it ended up in the "ATO zone". Earlier that year in spring due Russian aggression against Ukraine, the Russian Federation occupied the Ukrainian Autonomous Republic of Crimea.

On 7 October 2014, a former press-attache claimed that supporters of the Donetsk People's Republic killed 16-year-old goalkeeper Stepan Chubenko. Chubenko was killed on 25 July 2014 in Horbachevo-Mykhailivka, two days after he was kidnapped at the Donetsk Railway Station.

Near the end of the 2020–21 season the team name was changed from Avanhard Kramatorsk to FC Kramatorsk.

Honors
 Championship of the Ukrainian SSR
 1936 (as Ordzhonikidze Factory)

 Cup of the Ukrainian SSR
 1939

 Donetsk Oblast Champions
 1947, 1996, 2010

Fair Play award
  Winners (1) Fair Play award of Ukrainian First League: 2019-20

Sponsorships
Lotto Sport Italia

Leadership

Presidents
 2005 – 2008 Serhiy Karakuts
 2010 – 2017 Oleksandr Bolshakov
 2010 - Maksim Yefimov (honorary president)
 2021 – Karen Zargarian (head)

Directors
 2011 Vladyslav Dolhopolov (sports)
 ???? – 2017 Roman Bolshakov (general)
 2017 – 2021 Andriy Bezsonnyi
 2021 – Yevhen Shvets

Players

Current squad

Out on loan

League and cup history

Soviet period
{|class="wikitable"
|-bgcolor="#efefef"
! Season
! Div.
! Pos.
! Pl.
! W
! D
! L
! GS
! GA
! P
!Domestic Cup
!colspan=2|Other
!Notes
|-bgcolor=SteelBlue
|align=center|1936
|align=center rowspan=5|4th
|align=center bgcolor=gold|1
|align=center|4
|align=center|4
|align=center|0
|align=center|0
|align=center|10
|align=center|2
|align=center|12
|align=center|
|align=center|
|align=center|
|align=center|
|-bgcolor=SteelBlue
|align=center|1937
|align=center|4
|align=center|6
|align=center|2
|align=center|2
|align=center|2
|align=center|9
|align=center|6
|align=center|12
|align=center| finals
|align=center|SC
|align=center| finals
|align=center|
|-bgcolor=SteelBlue
|align=center|1938
|align=center|6
|align=center|11
|align=center|5
|align=center|1
|align=center|5
|align=center|18
|align=center|20
|align=center|22
|align=center| finals
|align=center|SC
|align=center| finals
|align=center|
|-bgcolor=SteelBlue
|align=center|1939
|align=center|5
|align=center|9
|align=center|4
|align=center|1
|align=center|4
|align=center|16
|align=center|15
|align=center|18
|align=center bgcolor=gold|Winner
|align=center|SC
|align=center| finals
|align=center|
|-bgcolor=SteelBlue
|align=center|1940
|align=center bgcolor=silver|2
|align=center|?
|align=center|?
|align=center|?
|align=center|?
|align=center|?
|align=center|?
|align=center|?
|align=center|Round 3
|align=center|
|align=center|
|align=center|
|-
|align=center|1941–1945
|align=center colspan=13|World War II, club was dissolved
|-bgcolor=SteelBlue
|align=center|1945
|align=center colspan=9|unknown
|align=center| finals
|align=center|
|align=center|
|align=center|
|-bgcolor=SteelBlue
|align=center|1946
|align=center rowspan=8|4th
|align=center|5
|align=center colspan=7|Group stage (Group East)
|align=center|Round 3
|align=center|
|align=center|
|align=center|
|-bgcolor=SteelBlue
|align=center rowspan=2|1947
|align=center bgcolor=gold|1
|align=center colspan=7|Group stage (Group 6)
|align=center rowspan=2 bgcolor=tan| finals
|align=center|
|align=center|
|align=center|
|-bgcolor=SteelBlue
|align=center bgcolor=silver|2
|align=center|5
|align=center|3
|align=center|1
|align=center|1
|align=center|14
|align=center|7
|align=center|7
|align=center|
|align=center|
|align=center|
|-bgcolor=SteelBlue
|align=center|1948
|align=center|9
|align=center colspan=7|Group stage (Group 5)
|align=center|Round 2
|align=center|
|align=center|
|align=center|
|-bgcolor=SteelBlue
|align=center|1949
|align=center|6
|align=center colspan=7|Group stage (Group 5)
|align=center|
|align=center|
|align=center|
|align=center|
|-bgcolor=SteelBlue
|align=center|1950
|align=center|5
|align=center colspan=7|Group stage (Group 3)
|align=center|
|align=center|
|align=center|
|align=center|
|-bgcolor=SteelBlue
|align=center|1951
|align=center|5
|align=center colspan=7|Group stage (Group 3)
|align=center|
|align=center|
|align=center|
|align=center|
|-bgcolor=SteelBlue
|align=center|1952
|align=center|7
|align=center|22
|align=center|7
|align=center|8
|align=center|7
|align=center|36
|align=center|29
|align=center|22
|align=center|
|align=center|
|align=center|
|align=center|Group 2
|-bgcolor=LightCyan
|align=center|1948
|align=center rowspan=2|2nd
|align=center|6
|align=center|14
|align=center|3
|align=center|4
|align=center|7
|align=center|23
|align=center|40
|align=center|10
|align=center|
|align=center|
|align=center|
|align=center|Group Ukraine, A
|-bgcolor=LightCyan
|align=center|1949
|align=center|11
|align=center|34
|align=center|12
|align=center|6
|align=center|16
|align=center|51
|align=center|70
|align=center|30
|align=center|
|align=center|
|align=center|
|align=center|Group Ukraine
|-
|align=center|1953–1955
|align=center colspan=13|Unknown status
|-bgcolor=SteelBlue
|align=center|1956
|align=center rowspan=5|4th
|align=center|7
|align=center|14
|align=center|4
|align=center|1
|align=center|9
|align=center|26
|align=center|28
|align=center|9
|align=center| finals
|align=center|
|align=center|
|align=center|Group 4
|-bgcolor=SteelBlue
|align=center|1957
|align=center|5
|align=center|10
|align=center|3
|align=center|1
|align=center|6
|align=center|9
|align=center|24
|align=center|7
|align=center| finals
|align=center|
|align=center|
|align=center|Group 5
|-bgcolor=SteelBlue
|align=center rowspan=2|1958
|align=center bgcolor=silver|2
|align=center|14
|align=center|8
|align=center|2
|align=center|4
|align=center|24
|align=center|15
|align=center|18
|align=center|
|align=center|
|align=center|
|align=center|Group 8
|-bgcolor=SteelBlue
|align=center|4
|align=center|5
|align=center|1
|align=center|3
|align=center|1
|align=center|3
|align=center|5
|align=center|5
|align=center|
|align=center|
|align=center|
|align=center|Group 2
|-bgcolor=SteelBlue
|align=center|1959
|align=center|8
|align=center|14
|align=center|2
|align=center|3
|align=center|9
|align=center|16
|align=center|31
|align=center|7
|align=center|
|align=center|
|align=center|
|align=center bgcolor=lightgreen|Group 3Admitted to masters
|-bgcolor=LightCyan
|align=center|1960
|align=center rowspan=4|2nd
|align=center|7
|align=center|36
|align=center|13
|align=center|12
|align=center|11
|align=center|41
|align=center|35
|align=center|38
|align=center|
|align=center|
|align=center|
|align=center|Group 2
|-bgcolor=LightCyan
|align=center|1961
|align=center|17
|align=center|36
|align=center|10
|align=center|8
|align=center|18
|align=center|30
|align=center|47
|align=center|28
|align=center|
|align=center bgcolor=pink|R.P/O
|align=center bgcolor=lightgreen|winner
|align=center|Group 2
|-bgcolor=LightCyan
|align=center rowspan=2|1962
|align=center|13
|align=center|24
|align=center|5
|align=center|5
|align=center|14
|align=center|28
|align=center|47
|align=center|15
|align=center|
|align=center|
|align=center|
|align=center|Group 3
|-bgcolor=LightCyan
|align=center|30
|align=center|10
|align=center|6
|align=center|2
|align=center|2
|align=center|20
|align=center|12
|align=center|14
|align=center|
|align=center|
|align=center|
|align=center bgcolor=pink|Places 29–39Relegated
|-bgcolor=PowderBlue
|align=center|1963
|align=center rowspan=9|3rd
|align=center|16
|align=center|38
|align=center|11
|align=center|11
|align=center|16
|align=center|34
|align=center|44
|align=center|33
|align=center|
|align=center bgcolor=pink|R.P/O
|align=center bgcolor=pink|loser
|align=center|Group 2
|-bgcolor=PowderBlue
|align=center rowspan=2|1964
|align=center|10
|align=center|30
|align=center|8
|align=center|11
|align=center|11
|align=center|27
|align=center|32
|align=center|27
|align=center|
|align=center|
|align=center|
|align=center|Group 3
|-bgcolor=PowderBlue
|align=center|26
|align=center|10
|align=center|5
|align=center|2
|align=center|3
|align=center|17
|align=center|12
|align=center|12
|align=center|
|align=center|
|align=center|
|align=center|Places 25–30
|-bgcolor=PowderBlue
|align=center rowspan=2|1965
|align=center|17
|align=center|32
|align=center|7
|align=center|6
|align=center|19
|align=center|23
|align=center|52
|align=center|20
|align=center|
|align=center|
|align=center|
|align=center|Group 3
|-bgcolor=PowderBlue
|align=center|44
|align=center|4
|align=center|2
|align=center|1
|align=center|1
|align=center|3
|align=center|2
|align=center|5
|align=center|
|align=center|
|align=center|
|align=center|Places 43–45
|-bgcolor=PowderBlue
|align=center|1966
|align=center|9
|align=center|38
|align=center|16
|align=center|8
|align=center|14
|align=center|49
|align=center|49
|align=center|40
|align=center|
|align=center|P/O
|align=center bgcolor=lightgreen|winner
|align=center|Group 1
|-bgcolor=PowderBlue
|align=center|1967
|align=center|16
|align=center|40
|align=center|10
|align=center|14
|align=center|16
|align=center|46
|align=center|52
|align=center|34
|align=center|
|align=center|
|align=center|
|align=center|Group 2
|-bgcolor=PowderBlue
|align=center|1968
|align=center|10
|align=center|40
|align=center|13
|align=center|13
|align=center|14
|align=center|43
|align=center|43
|align=center|39
|align=center|
|align=center|
|align=center|
|align=center|Group 2
|-bgcolor=PowderBlue
|align=center|1969
|align=center|11
|align=center|40
|align=center|12
|align=center|16
|align=center|12
|align=center|31
|align=center|30
|align=center|40
|align=center|
|align=center|
|align=center|
|align=center bgcolor=pink|Group 2Relegated
|-bgcolor=SteelBlue
|align=center rowspan=2|1970
|align=center rowspan=2|4th
|align=center|5
|align=center|26
|align=center|10
|align=center|7
|align=center|9
|align=center|32
|align=center|34
|align=center|27
|align=center|
|align=center|
|align=center|
|align=center|Group 2
|-bgcolor=SteelBlue
|align=center|12
|align=center|40
|align=center|13
|align=center|11
|align=center|16
|align=center|43
|align=center|54
|align=center|37
|align=center|
|align=center|
|align=center|
|align=center bgcolor=pink|Places 1–14Tier liquidated
|-
|align=center|1971–1973
|align=center colspan=13|Unknown status
|-bgcolor=SteelBlue
|align=center rowspan=2|1974
|align=center rowspan=10|4th
|align=center|1
|align=center|14
|align=center|8
|align=center|5
|align=center|1
|align=center|28
|align=center|12
|align=center|21
|align=center|
|align=center|
|align=center|
|align=center|Group 5
|-bgcolor=SteelBlue
|align=center|6
|align=center|5
|align=center|0
|align=center|1
|align=center|4
|align=center|3
|align=center|12
|align=center|1
|align=center|
|align=center|
|align=center|
|align=center|Final Group
|-bgcolor=SteelBlue
|align=center|1975
|align=center bgcolor=tan|3
|align=center|14
|align=center|7
|align=center|4
|align=center|3
|align=center|24
|align=center|19
|align=center|18
|align=center|
|align=center|
|align=center|
|align=center|Group 6
|-bgcolor=SteelBlue
|align=center|1976
|align=center|10
|align=center|18
|align=center|2
|align=center|3
|align=center|13
|align=center|9
|align=center|34
|align=center|7
|align=center| finals
|align=center|
|align=center|
|align=center|Group 5
|-
|}

Ukraine
{|class="wikitable"
|-bgcolor="#efefef"
! Season
! Div.
! Pos.
! Pl.
! W
! D
! L
! GS
! GA
! P
!Domestic Cup
!colspan=2|Europe
!Notes
|-bgcolor=SteelBlue
|align=center|1992–93
|align=center rowspan=4|4th
|align=center|12
|align=center|26
|align=center|7
|align=center|3
|align=center|16
|align=center|23
|align=center|57
|align=center|17
|align=center|
|align=center|
|align=center|
|align=center|
|-bgcolor=SteelBlue
|align=center|1993–94
|align=center|8
|align=center|26
|align=center|10
|align=center|4
|align=center|12
|align=center|45
|align=center|42
|align=center|24
|align=center|
|align=center|
|align=center|
|align=center|
|-bgcolor=SteelBlue
|align=center|1994–95
|align=center|14
|align=center|30
|align=center|7
|align=center|3
|align=center|20
|align=center|16
|align=center|30
|align=center|24
|align=center|
|align=center|
|align=center|
|align=center|
|-bgcolor=SteelBlue
|align=center|1995–96
|align=center|1
|align=center|4
|align=center|2
|align=center|2
|align=center|0
|align=center|8
|align=center|2
|align=center|8
|align=center|
|align=center|
|align=center|
|align=center|
|-
|align=center|1996–1998
|align=center colspan=13|Club idle
|-bgcolor=PowderBlue
|align=center|1998–99
|align=center|3rd "C"
|align=center|14
|align=center|26
|align=center|1
|align=center|2
|align=center|23
|align=center|4
|align=center|20
|align=center|–1
|align=center|
|align=center|
|align=center|
|align=center|– 6
|-
|align=center|1999–2010
|align=center colspan=13|Club idle
|-bgcolor=SteelBlue
|align=center|2011
|align=center|4th
|align=center|1
|align=center|8
|align=center|6
|align=center|1
|align=center|1
|align=center|15
|align=center|4
|align=center|19
|align=center|
|align=center|
|align=center|
|align=center bgcolor=lightgreen|Promoted
|-bgcolor=PowderBlue
|align=center|2011–12
|align=center|3rd "B"
|align=center bgcolor=silver|2
|align=center|26
|align=center|19
|align=center|1
|align=center|6
|align=center|41
|align=center|15
|align=center|58
|align=center| finals
|align=center|
|align=center|
|align=center bgcolor=lightgreen|Promoted
|-bgcolor=LightCyan
|align=center|2012–13
|align=center rowspan=2|2nd
|align=center|7
|align=center| 34 	
|align=center|15 	
|align=center|8 	
|align=center|11 	
|align=center|37 	
|align=center|26 	
|align=center|53
|align=center| finals
|align=center|
|align=center|
|align=center|
|-bgcolor=LightCyan
|align=center|2013–14
|align=center|15
|align=center|30
|align=center|7
|align=center|10
|align=center|13
|align=center|23
|align=center|27
|align=center|31
|align=center| finals
|align=center|
|align=center|
|align=center|
|-bgcolor=
|align=center|2014–15
|align=center colspan=13|Club suspended operation due to the Russian military intervention in Ukraine
|-bgcolor=LightCyan
|align=center|2015–16
|align=center rowspan=6|2nd
|align=center|13
|align=center|30 	
|align=center|8 	
|align=center|8 	
|align=center|14 	
|align=center|28 	
|align=center|42 	
|align=center|32
|align=center| finals
|align=center|
|align=center|
|align=center|
|-bgcolor=LightCyan
|align=center|2016–17
|align=center|7
|align=center|34 	
|align=center|14 	
|align=center|10 	
|align=center|10 	
|align=center|32 	
|align=center|28 	
|align=center|52
|align=center| finals
|align=center|
|align=center|
|align=center|
|-bgcolor=LightCyan
|align=center|2017–18
|align=center|6
|align=center|34
|align=center|15
|align=center|7
|align=center|12
|align=center|44
|align=center|42
|align=center|52
|align=center| finals
|align=center|
|align=center|
|align=center|
|-bgcolor=LightCyan
|align=center|2018–19
|align=center|5
|align=center|28
|align=center|14
|align=center|6
|align=center|8
|align=center|44
|align=center|26
|align=center|48
|align=center| finals
|align=center|
|align=center|
|align=center|
|-bgcolor=LightCyan
|align=center|2019–20
|align=center|8
|align=center|30 	
|align=center|13 	
|align=center|6 	
|align=center|11 	
|align=center|	37 	
|align=center|	40 
|align=center|45
|align=center| finals
|align=center|
|align=center|
|align=center|
|-bgcolor=LightCyan
|align=center|2020–21
|align=center|12
|align=center|30 	
|align=center|9 	
|align=center|5 	
|align=center|16 	
|align=center|32 	
|align=center|	51 
|align=center|32
|align=center| finals
|align=center|
|align=center|
|align=center|
|}

Managers
 2011–2013 Sergei Shevchenko
 2013–2016 Yakiv Kripak
 2016–2020 Oleksandr Kosevych
 2020– Oleksiy Horodov

External links
  Official website
 All goals of Avanhard - SC Kramatorsk (YouTube)
 Нардеп Ефимов задекларировал миллионы в банках и дома, шахту и ветряной парк. hi.dn.ua. 6 June 2020
 ФК "Краматорск" представил новичков команды. Задача-максимум - 5-е место в Первой лиге. www.kramatorskpost.com. 22 July 2021

References

 
Kramatorsk
Kramatorsk
Sport in Kramatorsk
Association football clubs established in 1955
1955 establishments in Ukraine
Football clubs in the Ukrainian Soviet Socialist Republic